Ian Belsey (born 1962) is a lyric baritone specialising in opera of the bel canto period, but is best known for his performances in light music and operetta, particularly the works of Gilbert and Sullivan.

Biography
Belsey was born in Bromley, making his stage debut in 1970 at the age of 8 at the Pier Theatre, Bournemouth in The Sooty Show. He studied at the Royal Academy of Dancing, the Guildhall School of Music & Drama and at the Royal College of Music, both in the Opera School and as a post-graduate.

Career
Belsey has appeared in opera and the works of Gilbert and Sullivan at major theatres and concert halls throughout the United Kingdom and in France, Germany, Holland, Spain, New York, Bermuda, the Far East and aboard the QE2 on the World Cruise.

He was a principal baritone with the Regency Opera Company in Tosca and The Marriage of Figaro (1986), English Festival Opera's La boheme (1995) and Pimlico Opera's tour of La Traviata, as well as baritone soloist in the Magic of Broadway in Yarmouth and Iolanthe for Opera Options at Hever Castle. He also performed Mountararat in Iolanthe and Mentchikoff in The Count of Luxembourg in the 1990s for the D'Oyly Carte Opera Company. He has been a guest artist for the Welsh National Opera and the Northern Sinfonia, and has given vocal master classes at most of the leading drama schools in England. He has also appeared in all of the International Covent Garden Festival's productions of Trial by Jury.

His musical theatre work includes productions of Evita (Opera House Manchester), Cats (Opera House Blackpool), the national and international tour of Chess, Passarino & Mousieur Andre in The Phantom of the Opera (Her Majesty's Theatre, London 1998) and an extensive national tour of King's Rhapsody. His other work includes Stairway to the Stars, Hello, Dolly!, My One and Only (all at the London Palladium), the Cole Porter Centennial Gala at the Prince Edward Theatre, Mr Wonderful at the Theatre Royal, Drury Lane, and the Italian Singer in Around the World in Eighty Minutes at the Royal Albert Hall, all of which have been recorded for radio and on CD.

He was a baritone soloist with Hinge and Bracket, appearing at their famous Prom Nights, culminating in their 21st Anniversary Gala at The Royal Festival Hall in 1995.

Recent projects
Belsey has appeared with Opera della Luna as Captain Corcoran in several of their productions of H.M.S. Pinafore since 2001. Since 2004, he has appeared as the Sergeant of Police in Opera della Luna's productions of The Parson's Pirates, as the title role in The Mikado, as Sir Roderic Murgatroyd in The Ghosts of Ruddigore, La Belle Helene, and The Tales of Hoffmann.  He appeared in the company's 2008 productions of Moonstruck and The Amorous Goldfish.

He has also played Major General Stanley in The Pirates of Penzance, Eisenstein in Die Fledermaus and The Lord Chancellor in Iolanthe at The Sevenoaks Festival.  He was Papageno in The Magic Flute with New Devon Opera in 2005 ("quite superb throughout"). He made his début at the Wigmore Hall in the children's entertainment, The Magic Flute & The Broomstick, which was written by Simon Butteriss.  In 2008, Belsey played Apollo in the reconstruction of Thespis at the Normansfield Theatre, Teddington, which was the first professional British production since 1872.

References

External links
Belsey's Official Website

Belsey in The Mikado with Opera della Luna

1962 births
English operatic baritones
Alumni of the Guildhall School of Music and Drama
Alumni of the Royal College of Music
Living people
People from Bromley
Singers from London
20th-century British male opera singers
21st-century British male opera singers